R Ramdinthara (born 23 August 2002), commonly known by his nickname Tharpuia, is an Indian professional footballer who plays as a forward for Aizawl in the I-League.

Club career

Champhai Kanan 
On 19 July 2022, Tharpuia scored the two winning goals for Champhai Kanan VC in the final of the 2022 All Mizoram Inter Village Tournament, against Sialhawk VC. He was awarded the 'Top Scorer' title, a trophy and a cash prize of ₹5,000 for scoring 13 goals in the tournament.

Aizawl 
Eight days later, Tharpuia was snapped up by I-League club Aizawl. On 15 November, he assisted on his debut in the I-League against TRAU, in a 1–1 stalemate.

Career statistics

Club

References

2002 births
Living people
Footballers from Mizoram
Indian footballers
Aizawl FC players